Ivan Levingston (born November 19, 1994) is an American journalist and a reporter for Bloomberg News based in London, England covering European technology. He was previously based in Israel where he covered the country's government and technology sector.

Early life
Levingston was born in New York City and grew up in Mount Airy, Philadelphia. He is a graduate of both Jack M. Barrack Hebrew Academy and Harvard University.

Career
At Harvard, Levingston served as the Associate Managing Editor of The Harvard Crimson. He later worked as an intern at Roll Call and as a breaking news reporter at CNBC.

In 2017, he was hired by Bloomberg News to serve as a reporter in both Boston and New York. There he covered asset management, hedge funds, and university endowments. He moved to Israel in 2018 to cover stories involving the Israeli government and economy for Bloomberg. In August 2020, Levingston reported for Bloomberg on the Abraham Accords and was aboard the first commercial Israeli aircraft to cross through either Saudi Arabian airspace or to land in the United Arab Emirates.

Levingston shifted to covering European technology in April 2021 and is now based in England.

References

1994 births
Living people
Jewish American journalists
Journalists from New York City
Journalists from New York (state)
Harvard College alumni
The Harvard Crimson people
Jack M. Barrack Hebrew Academy alumni
21st-century American Jews